Shakir Smith (born January 6, 1987) is a Bermudian footballer who currently plays for PHC Zebras.

Club career
Smith began his career as a defender with PHC Zebras before joining the Bermuda Hogges in the USL Second Division.

International career
He made his debut for Bermuda in a September 2012 CONCACAF Gold Cup qualification match against Puerto Rico and has, as of November 2015, earned a total of 3 caps, scoring no goals.

References

External links

1987 births
Living people
Association football defenders
Bermudian footballers
Bermuda international footballers
Bermuda Hogges F.C. players
PHC Zebras players
USL League Two players
Bermuda under-20 international footballers